The following properties are listed on the National Register of Historic Places in Sussex County, Delaware, United States.

Contents:  Divisions in Delaware

|}

Former listing

|}

References

 
Sussex